The A-segment is the 1st category in the passenger car classification system defined by the European Commission. It is used for city cars, the smallest category of passenger cars defined.

A-segment sales represent approx. 7-8% of the market in 2010s. It is approximately equivalent to the kei car class in Japan.

Definition 

Characteristics 
Body styles for A-segment cars in Europe are always hatchbacks. But as crossovers gain popularity, new models may shift to resemble crossovers. Such examples are the Suzuki Ignis and the Toyota Aygo X. Other body styles such as sedans are not present in this segment because these shapes largely prove impractical at typical A-segment dimensions.

History 
As of 2017, 2018, 2019 and 2020, A-segment sales account for 8.1%, 8%, 7.7% and 6.8% market share in Europe respectively.

Current models 

In 2020 the ten highest selling A-segment cars in Europe were Fiat Panda, Fiat 500, Toyota Aygo, Renault Twingo, Volkswagen Up!, Hyundai i10, Kia Picanto, Peugeot 108, Citroën C1 and Suzuki Ignis.

100,000 - 200,000 sales (Best-Selling)

50,000 - 100,000 sales

10,000 - 50,000 sales

Sales figures in Europe

Market share in Europe 
2019 - In 2019, sales of minicars were down 2% compared to a total market gain of 1% which means this segment now makes up 7.7% of the total European car market at 1.21 million sales, down from 8% in 2018. And with margins on minicars under pressure due to increased costs to comply with stricter safety and emissions standards, manufacturers are scaling back investments in to minicars or switching to an EV-only strategy. 

In Italy, A-segment cars represented 16.4% of car sales in the first half of 2019.

2020 - European sales of minicars were down by a third in 2020, which translates to nearly 400,000 fewer sales and means the segment loses market share as the overall market is down 24%. As a result, this segment now makes up 6.8% of the total European car market, down from 7.7% last year. And their share is expected to shrink further in coming years, as manufacturers are pulling out of this segment or switching their models to EV-only. This is a result of increasing costs to comply with stricter safety and especially emissions standards, which makes minicars nearly unprofitable, especially considering that for most models from European brands this is the only market.

Market share in other countries 
In the United States, minicar segment cars represented 0.5% of the market share.
 
In 2020 the highest selling minicar segment cars in  the U.S. were the Chevrolet Spark, Mitsubishi Mirage and Mini Cooper.

In India, historically the A-segment cars had the highest sales. Sales have been in decline in recent years, falling from 70,000 sales per month in 2014 to 47,000 sales per month in 2016.

As of 2019, several A-segment cars had successes outside Europe, such as Hyundai Grand i10, Honda Brio, Kia Picanto, Toyota Wigo, Suzuki Celerio, Suzuki Wagon R, Suzuki/Maruti Alto, Ford Figo, Smart ForTwo, Citroën C1, Peugeot 108, and modern Fiat 500.

See also

 B-segment
 Euro Car Segment
 Car classification
 Vehicle size class
 Hatchback
 Economy car
 Microcar
 
 Kei car
 Kei truck
 Crossover city car (A-segment SUV)

References 

Euro car segments